The Minnesota Martial Arts Academy is a martial arts training center in Brooklyn Center, Minnesota. It was founded in 1992 by Greg Nelson, a former NCAA Division 1 wrestler at the University of Minnesota.

History
The Academy provides training in combative martial arts that include Muay Thai, Wrestling, Boxing, Brazilian Jiu Jitsu, Judo, Filipino Martial Arts, Jeet Kune Do, Modern Army Combatives, and mixed martial arts. The Academy's MMA team, Team Academy, has a winning percentage of 80% 

Greg Nelson combined his background in NCAA Division 1 wrestling, from college, with the Thai-boxing training he began in 1983 to form the basis of his Mixed Martial arts system. Starting the gym in 1992 the focus was on combative martial arts & sport martial arts.  As The Academy grew it attracted future UFC champions such as Dave Menne, Brock Lesnar, Sean Sherk and Rose Namajunas.

Notable fighters
John Castañeda - UFC
Pat Barry - UFC, K-1, Glory
Mike Richman - Bellator Fighting Championships, Bare Knuckle Fighting Championship
Sean Sherk - Former UFC Lightweight World Champion
Brock Larson - UFC, WEC Title Contender
Chris Tuchscherer - UFC
Jacob Volkmann - UFC, Former VFC Welterweight Champion, FILA- Grappling World Champion 80 kg
Nick Thompson - Former BodogFIGHT Welterweight World  Champion, UFC Veteran, Strikeforce, Sengoku
Jon Madsen - UFC TUF 10 cast member
Logan Clark - UFC & WEC Veteran, Sengoku
Kaitlin Young - Invicta Fighting Championships 
Brandon Girtz - Bellator Fighting Championships
Nick Kirk - Bellator Fighting Championships
Rose Namajunas - UFC Strawweight Champion, Invicta Fighting Championships, King of the cage
Troy Jones - Glory

Former fighters
Jordan Parsons - Bellator
Dave Menne - Former UFC Middleweight World Champion
Nik Lentz - UFC
Brad Kohler -Former UFC fighter
Brock Lesnar - Former UFC Heavyweight World Champion  
Cole Konrad - Bellator Fighting Championships Heavyweight Tournament Champion

References

External links

Educational institutions established in 1992
Mixed martial arts training facilities
Sports in Minneapolis–Saint Paul
1992 establishments in Minnesota